Ormosia hosiei is a species of flowering plant in the family Fabaceae.

Attributes
It is only found in eastern and central China (in Anhui, Fujian, Gansu, Guizhou, Hubei, SE Jiangsu, Jiangxi, S Shaanxi, Sichuan, and Zhejiang provinces). It is becoming rare due to habitat loss and over-harvesting. The natural habitat of this species is in low-elevation broadleaved forest. It is under second-class national protection.

Naming
This plant is named after Alexander Hosie, the British consul-general to China who amassed large botanical collections in China and subsequently sent to Kew Gardens, London.

References 

hosiei
Endemic flora of China
Trees of China
Near threatened plants
Taxonomy articles created by Polbot